Billy Williams  (born 1896) was a Welsh international footballer. He was part of the Wales national football team, playing 1 match and scoring 1 goal on 14 February 1925 against Scotland during the 1924–25 British Home Championship. In doing so, he became the first, and so far only, Northampton Town player to score an international goal.

See also
 List of Wales international footballers (alphabetical)

References

1896 births
Northampton Town F.C. players
Place of birth missing
Wales international footballers
Welsh footballers

Association footballers not categorized by position
Year of death missing